Tolkyn gas field is a natural gas field located in Mangystau Province. It was discovered in 2001 and developed by Ascom Group. In 2010, the Republic of Kazakhstan cancelled the Subsoil Use Contracts for Tolkyn and the neighbouring Borankol oil field. The total proven reserves of the Tolkyn gas field are around 1.25 trillion cubic feet (35×109m³), and production is centered on 128.8 million cubic feet/day (3.65×106m³).

References 

Natural gas fields in Kazakhstan